Eric Basran (born 19 October 1998) is a Canadian professional boxer. As an amateur, Basran won a bronze medal at the 2018 Commonwealth Games as well as competing at the 2019 World Championships.

Amateur career

Commonwealth Games result
Gold Coast 2018
Round of 16: Defeated Betero Aaree (Kiribati) 5–0
Quarter-finals: Defeated Zweli Dlamini (Swaziland) 5–0
Semi-finals: Defeated by Kurt Walker (Northern Ireland) 3–2

World Championships result
Yekaterinburg 2019 
First Round: Defeated Erik Petrosyan (Armenia) 5–0
Second Round: Defeated Nilo Guerrero (Nicaragua) 5–0
Third Round: Defeated by Kurt Walker (Republic of Ireland) 5–0

Professional career

Early career

Basran made his professional debut on 24 March 2022 against Ariel Gonzalez Vazquez. Basran won via unanimous decision after outboxing his opponent throughout the duration of the bout.

Professional boxing record

References

External links

1998 births
Living people
People from Surrey, British Columbia
Canadian male boxers
Boxers at the 2018 Commonwealth Games
Commonwealth Games medallists in boxing
Commonwealth Games bronze medallists for Canada
Medallists at the 2018 Commonwealth Games